The Very Best of Deacon Blue is a greatest hits compilation for the Scottish rock band Deacon Blue.  It is composed of singles and album tracks from the band's previous albums, plus two B-sides, "Indigo Sky" from the "Hang Your Head" single, and "When You Were a Boy You Were a Beautiful Boy" from the "Everytime You Sleep" single.

Track listing
All songs written by Ricky Ross, except where noted:

 "Dignity" – 4:00
 "When Will You (Make My Telephone Ring)" - 4:19
 "Chocolate Girl" - 3:16
 "Raintown" – 3:50
 "The Very Thing" – 3:34
 "Love's Great Fears" (Ross, Prime) – 3:42
 "He Looks Like Spencer Tracy Now" – 3:50
 "Loaded" (Prime, Ross, Kelling) – 4:30
 "Real Gone Kid" - 4:05
 "Wages Day" – 3:11
 "Fergus Sings the Blues" (Ross, Prime) - 3:51
 "Love and Regret" - 4:50
 "Queen of the New Year" (Ross, Prime) - 3:36
 "Circus Lights" - 4:59
 "My America" (Ross, Prime) - 3:10
 "Long Window to Love" - 3:12
 "Orphans" (Ross, Vernal) - 3:33
 "I'll Never Fall in Love Again" (Bacharach, David) - 2:46
 "Your Swaying Arms" – 4:12
 "Twist and Shout" – 3:34
 "Cover from the Sky" – 3:37
 "The Day that Jackie Jumped the Jail" - 3:42
 "A Brighter Star than You Will Shine" (Ross, Prime) – 4:32
 "The Wildness" (Ross, Prime) – 5:42
 "Your Town" - 5:19
 "Will We Be Lovers" (Ross, Osborne) - 3:53
 "Only Tender Love" - 5:06
 "I Was Right and You Were Wrong" - 4:52
 "Indigo Sky" - 2:48
 "Bethlehem's Gate" - 4:47
 "Bound to Love" - 4:24
 "Still in the Mood" - 4:01
 "Jesus Do Your Hands Still Feel the Rain" - 5:14
 "Rae" (Ross, Prime, MacDonald)– 4:46
 "Silverlake" (Ross, Prime) – 4:36
 "Homesick" – 4:14
 "Everytime You Sleep" – 4:06
 "When You Were a Boy You Were a Beautiful Boy" -

Personnel 

Ricky Ross – vocals, guitar, piano, keyboard
Lorraine McIntosh – vocal
James Prime – keyboard
Ewen Vernal – bass
Graeme Kelling – guitar
Dougie Vipond – drums

2001 greatest hits albums
Deacon Blue albums
Columbia Records compilation albums